Jack Ettwell George Sexton (27 February 1907– 26 October 1935) was an Australian rules footballer who played in the South Australian National Football League (SANFL) and for  in the Victorian Football League (VFL).

Sexton was a centreman and started his career in 1925 with Glenelg. In 1930, he crossed to West Adelaide after a dispute over his salary. He won a Magarey Medal in 1931 and in the following season, he moved to Victoria and joined Fitzroy. He captained Fitzroy in 1932 and 1933 and played a total of 29 VFL games before returning to South Australia in 1935. Now playing with Norwood as captain-coach, Sexton starting suffering from pleurisy and was forced to resign just six games into the season. He finished with a total of 101 senior games and in October that year, he died from his illness.

References

1907 births
1935 deaths
Fitzroy Football Club players
Glenelg Football Club players
West Adelaide Football Club players
Norwood Football Club players
Norwood Football Club coaches
Magarey Medal winners
Australian rules footballers from South Australia
Deaths from pleurisy